Struck Down is the second studio album by American hard rock/heavy metal band Yesterday and Today, released in 1978. It was one of the last rock albums to be released by London Records.

The band would change their name to Y&T for their next studio album, Earthshaker.

Critical reception
On its release, reviewers of Record World considered group "completely self-contained" and expressed an opinion that "hard rockers and heavy metal enthusiasts should delight to "I'm Lost" and "Struck Down".

Track listing

Personnel
Dave Meniketti – vocals, guitar
Joey Alves – guitar, vocals
Phil Kennemore – bass, vocals
Leonard Haze – percussion, drums, vocals
Robert Russ – piano
Cherie Currie – backing vocals
Galen Cook – organ

References

External links
Official Y&T website

Y&T albums
London Records albums
1978 albums